Norway participated in the Eurovision Song Contest 2021 in Rotterdam, the Netherlands. The Norwegian broadcaster,  (NRK), used the national selection  to decide their representative.

Background

Norway had won the contest on three occasions: in 1985 with the song "" performed by Bobbysocks!, in 1995 with the song "" performed by Secret Garden and in 2009 with the song "Fairytale" performed by Alexander Rybak. Norway also had the two dubious distinctions of having finished last in the Eurovision final more than any other country and for having the most "" (zero points) in the contest, the latter being a record the nation shared together with Austria. The country had finished last eleven times and had failed to score a point during four contests. In 2019, Norway was represented by Keiino with the song "Spirit in the Sky", which placed 6th in the final with 331 points. In 2020, Ulrikke Brandstorp was set to represent Norway with the song "Attention" before the contest's cancellation.

The Norwegian national broadcaster,  (NRK), broadcasts the event within Norway and organises the selection process for the nation's entry. The broadcaster has traditionally organised the national final , which has selected the Norwegian entry for the Eurovision Song Contest in all but one of their participations.

Before Eurovision

Melodi Grand Prix 2021

 was the 59th edition of the Norwegian national final  which selected Norway's entry for the 2021 contest. The competition consisted of five semi-finals between 16 January and 13 February, a Last Chance round on 15 February and a final on 20 February 2021. The five semi-final shows were hosted by Kåre Magnus Bergh, Ingrid Gjessing Linhave and Ronny Brede Aase, while the Last Chance round and the final were hosted by Kåre Magnus Bergh, Ingrid Gjessing Linhave and Silje Nordnes. The national final was televised on NRK1, NRK TV, broadcast via radio on NRK P1 as well as streamed online at NRK's official website nrk.no.

Semi-finals and Last Chance round 

 The first semi-final took place on 16 January 2021. "Let Loose" performed by Blåsemafian feat. Hazel qualified to the final.
 The second semi-final took place on 23 January 2021. "Hero" performed by Raylee qualified to the final.
 The third semi-final took place on 30 January 2021. "Witch Woods" performed by Emmy qualified to the final.
 The fourth semi-final took place on 6 February 2021. "My Lonely Voice" performed by Kiim qualified to the final.
 The fifth semi-final took place on 13 February 2021. "I Can't Escape" performed by Imerika qualified to the final.
 The Last Chance round took place on 15 February 2021. "Faith Bloody Faith" performed by Jorn qualified to the final.

Final 
Twelve songs consisting of the six semi-final and Last Chance qualifiers alongside the six pre-qualified songs competed during the final on 20 February 2021 at the H3 Arena in Fornebu. The winner was selected over three rounds of online voting. In the first round, the top four entries were selected to proceed to the second round, the Gold Final. In the Gold Final, the top two entries were selected to proceed to the third round, the Gold Duel. In the Gold Duel, the results of the online vote were revealed by Norway's five regions and led to the victory of "Fallen Angel" performed by Tix with 380,033 votes.

Preparations 

Tix recorded a backup tape of his performance on 22 February 2021, which would have been broadcast at Eurovision in the event that he was unable to travel to Rotterdam for the contest.

At Eurovision 
According to Eurovision rules, all nations with the exceptions of the host country and the "Big Five" (France, Germany, Italy, Spain and the United Kingdom) are required to qualify from one of two semi-finals in order to compete in the final; the top ten countries from each semi-final progress to the final. The European Broadcasting Union (EBU) split up the competing countries into six different pots based on voting patterns from previous contests, with countries with favourable voting histories put into the same pot. For the 2021 contest, the semi-final allocation draw held for 2020 which was held on 28 January 2020, will be used. Norway was placed into the first semi-final, which was held on 18 May 2021, and was scheduled to perform in the second half of the show.

Semi-final 
Once all the competing songs for the 2021 contest had been released, the running order for the semi-finals was decided by the shows' producers rather than through another draw, so that similar songs were not placed next to each other. Norway was set to perform in position 9, following the entry from Cyprus and preceding the entry from Croatia.

On 18 May, the day the semi-final was held, Norway qualified for the Grand Final, to be held on 22 May.

Final 
Norway performed 22nd in the grand final on 22 May 2021, following Azerbaijan and preceding the Netherlands.

Voting 
Voting during the three shows involved each country awarding two sets of points from 1-8, 10 and 12: one from their professional jury and the other from televoting. Each nation's jury consisted of five music industry professionals who are citizens of the country they represent, with a diversity in gender and age represented. The judges assess each entry based on the performances during the second Dress Rehearsal of each show, which takes place the night before each live show, against a set of criteria including: vocal capacity; the stage performance; the song's composition and originality; and the overall impression by the act. Jury members may only take part in panel once every three years, and are obliged to confirm that they are not connected to any of the participating acts in a way that would impact their ability to vote impartially. Jury members should also vote independently, with no discussion of their vote permitted with other jury members. The exact composition of the professional jury, and the results of each country's jury and televoting were released after the grand final; the individual results from each jury member were also released in an anonymised form.

Points awarded to Norway

Points awarded by Norway

Detailed voting results 
The following members comprised the Norwegian jury:
 Kate Gulbrandsen
 
 Rolf Lennart Stensø
 Vilde
 Aleksander Walmann

References

External links

Full national final on nrk.no

2021
Countries in the Eurovision Song Contest 2021
Eurovision
Eurovision